Kastri is a village and  a community of the Parga municipality. Before the 2011 local government reform it was part of the municipality of Fanari, of which it was a municipal district. The 2011 census recorded 277 inhabitants in the village. The community of Kastri covers an area of 4.476 km2.

Geography
The village stands on a plain from where Acheron passes through. It is on the northern part of the Preveza regional unit in a distance of almost 47 km from Preveza.

History
The ruins of an acropolis can be seen on a hill near Kastri, which give the village its name, meaning "castle". These are likely to be the remains of the ancient city Pandosia.

See also
List of settlements in the Preveza regional unit

References 

Populated places in Preveza (regional unit)